Roundfort (Irish: Lois na Maol) is a parish in County Mayo, Ireland with a church (Church of the Immaculate Conception), school (Roundfort National School), a playschool and a local pub (Delia Murphy's). Farming is the main provider within the parish for those who do not work in neighbouring towns and cities such as Ballinrobe, Claremorris, Castlebar and Galway and further afield.

Geography 
Roundfort is located approximately two miles south of Hollymount and six miles east of Ballinrobe.  The River Robe runs through the parish. The parish also has views of the Partry Mountains and Croagh Patrick and Croghan hill.

Notable People 
 Delia Murphy, singer and ballad collector. Some of her songs are "The Blackbird", "The Spinning Wheel" and "Three Lovely Lassies". (1902–1971)
 Ciaran Kelly, League of Ireland goalkeeper

See also 
Roman Catholic Archdiocese of Tuam

References 

Religion in County Mayo